The Research Institute for Sustainability (RIFS) in Potsdam (former Institute for Advanced Sustainability Studies (IASS) or Forschungsinstitut für Nachhaltigkeit in german) conducts research with the aim of investigating, identifying, and advancing development pathways for transformation processes towards sustainability in Germany and abroad. The Institute joined the Helmholtz Association in 2023 and is affiliated with the Helmholtz Centre Potsdam – GFZ German Research Centre for Geosciences. Its research approach is transdisciplinary, transformative, and co-creative. The Institute cooperates with partners in science, political and administrative institutions, the business community, and civil society to develop solutions for sustainability challenges that enjoy broad public support. Its central research topics include the energy transition, climate change and socio-technical transformations, as well as sustainable governance and participation, and cultures of transformation in the Anthropocene. A strong network of national and international partners and a Fellow Programme supports the work of the Institute.

Organisation 
The IASS currently employs around 120 persons, including Fellows from over 30 countries. In 2019 the Board of Directors was composed of the Institute's three Scientific Directors – Mark G. Lawrence, Patrizia Nanz and Ortwin Renn – and its Head of Administration, Jakob Meyer. The IASS receives funding from the German Federal Ministry for Education and Research (85%) and the Federal State of Brandenburg (15%). The Institute's research programme currently spans five areas: Democratic Transformations; Systemic Interdependencies: Nature, Technology, Society; Perceptions, Values, Orientation; Energy Systems and Societal Change; Governance for the Environment and Society. These research areas are supported in their work by a cross-cutting research area tasked with facilitating dialogue between science, policy-makers, and civil society actors.

The IASS is a registered voluntary association under German law. The Institute's supervisory, governing, and advisory bodies are its General Assembly, Board of Directors and Advisory Board.

History 
The IASS was founded in Potsdam, Germany, on 2 February 2009. German politician and environmental policy expert Klaus Töpfer was the Institute's founding director. He led the Institute as its executive director until September 2015, together with scientific directors Carlo Rubbia (June 2010 – May 2015) and Mark G. Lawrence (from October 2011). At a founding symposium held under the patronage of Angela Merkel, the then Federal Minister of Education and Research Annette Schavan stated: "Under Professor Töpfer's leadership, the Institute will be able to gain international prominence and underscore Germany's strong position in this field."

The idea for the IASS was born in 2007 at the Potsdam Nobel Laureate Symposium "Global Sustainability – A Nobel Cause". The symposium brought together leading researchers and decision-makers and resulted in the publication of the widely regarded Potsdam Memorandum, which called for a concerted effort to tap into "all sources of ingenuity" to address the challenges of the twenty-first century. The memorandum urged the establishment of a new "global contract" between science and society to bring together relevant knowledge within and beyond the science system to meet challenges to sustainability arising in the Anthropocene.

In January 2023, the IASS will merge with the Helmholtz Association, Germany’s largest scientific organization, and will be incorporated into the Helmholtz Centre Potsdam – German Research Centre for Geosciences (GFZ), while retaining its scientific independence. The GFZ is Germany’s national research centre for the study of the geosphere.

Publications 
The IASS uses a number of publications formats to disseminate its findings and policy recommendations. These include:

 IASS Policy Briefs – Policy recommendations and assessments 
 IASS Fact Sheets – Brief overviews of research relating to topics addressed by the Institute 
 IASS Studies – Detailed research findings addressing a central issue
 IASS Working Paper – Interim research findings and interventions in current debates

Other publication formats include articles in scholarly journals, statements, monographs, and edited volumes. The institute also hosts a blog on its website.

Cooperation 
The IASS collaborates with numerous partners in Germany and abroad. Its major regional partners include the University of Potsdam, GFZ German Research Centre for Geosciences, a research centre operated by the Alfred Wegener Institute for Polar and Marine Research, and Potsdam Institute for Climate Impact Research. In January 2023, when joining the Helmholtz Association, it will form part of the German Research Centre for Geosciences (GFZ).

References

External links 
 Research Institute for Sustainability
 Institut für Klimawandel, Erdsystem und Nachhaltigkeit – Artikel im PotsdamWiki
 Vorbild Princeton: Potsdam bekommt eine Denkfabrik für Klimaforschung – Spiegel Online, 30. Juni 2009

Climate change organizations
Environmental research institutes
Organizations established in 2009
Organisations based in Potsdam
2009 establishments in Germany